Gary Harvey is a Canadian television director, writer and producer. He directed episodes 2x11 "What Goes Up Must Come Down", 4x02 "Osso Barko" and 4x04 "Born This Way" of Being Erica.

Awards
In 1996, Harvey won the CableACE award for International Dramatic Special or Movie, The War Between Us. The win was shared with William Wallace Gray, Walter Daroshin and Valerie Gray. He has also received six Directors Guild of Canada award nominations, six Gemini award nominations and five Leo award nominations.

In 2011, Harvey directed the television film Taken from Me: The Tiffany Rubin Story for Lifetime. He received a Directors Guild of Canada nomination for his work in it.

External links
 

Canadian television directors
Canadian television producers
Living people